Lakes in the German state Mecklenburg-Vorpommern are:

There are many lakes in the Mecklenburgische Seenplatte district, the Ludwigslust-Parchim district, the Nordwestmecklenburg district, and the Rostock district of Mecklenburg-Vorpommern state.

References
 

Lakes